Enhelsove, known officially as Buran since 2016, is an urban-type settlement in Krasnodon Municipality, Luhansk Raion (district) of Luhansk Oblast in eastern Ukraine. Population:

Demographics
Native language distribution as of the Ukrainian Census of 2001:
 Ukrainian: 3.43%
 Russian: 96.07%

References

Urban-type settlements in Luhansk Raion